WRCS (970 AM) is a radio station broadcasting a Gospel Music format. Licensed to Ahoskie, North Carolina, United States.  The station is currently owned by WRCS-AM 970 Inc.

External links

Gospel radio stations in the United States
RCS
Radio stations established in 1948